The House of Sobieski (plural: Sobiescy, feminine form: Sobieska) was a prominent magnate family of Polish nobility in the 16th and 17th centuries from which the King of Poland and Grand Duke of Lithuania Jan III Sobieski originated. The family used the Janina coat of arms.

History
According to the family's legend, it traced its lineage to a Polish duke, Leszek II the Black. Another family legend said that they were the descendants of Duke Sobiesław, the son of Leszko III, a legendary ruler of the Popielids dynasty. The family reached the height of its power and importance in the late 16th and 17th centuries, when one of its members was elected King of Poland: John III Sobieski (Jan III Sobieski). The last male member of the branch of the family that began with John's grandfather, Marek Sobieski, in the 16th century was Jakub Ludwik Sobieski (1667–1737).

Coat of arms
The Sobieski family used the Janina coat of arms, and their motto was Vel cum hoc, vel super hoc.

Notable members

Palaces

Famous descendants
Among the descendants of John III Sobieski were one Holy Roman Emperor (simultaneously one King of Bohemia and one King of Germany), seven Kings of Saxony (simultaneously one Duke of Warsaw), one King of Bavaria, two Kings of Italy (simultaneously one Emperor of Ethiopia and one King of the Albanians), one Tsar of Bulgaria, one Emperor of Austria (simultaneously one King of Hungary), one Queen consort of Spain and one titular Queen consort of England, Ireland and Scotland.

Tree

 John III Sobieski, married Marie Casimire Louise de La Grange d'Arquien
 Theresa Kunegunda Sobieska, married Maximilian II Emanuel, Elector of Bavaria
 Charles VII, Holy Roman Emperor 
 Duchess Maria Antonia of Bavaria 
 Frederick Augustus I of Saxony 
 Anthony of Saxony 
 Maximilian, Hereditary Prince of Saxony, married Princess Carolina of Parma (descendant of King Stanisław I Leszczyński)
 Princess Maria Anna of Saxony (1799–1832)
 Archduchess Auguste Ferdinande of Austria
 Ludwig III of Bavaria 
 Frederick Augustus II of Saxony 
 John of Saxony 
 Princess Elisabeth of Saxony
 Margherita of Savoy
 Victor Emmanuel III of Italy 
 Giovanna of Italy
 Simeon Saxe-Coburg-Gotha 
 Albert of Saxony 
 George, King of Saxony 
 Frederick Augustus III of Saxony 
 Princess Maria Josepha of Saxony (1867–1944)
 Charles I of Austria 
 Maria Josepha Amalia, Queen of Spain
 James Louis Sobieski
 Maria Clementina Sobieska (titular Queen consort of England, Ireland and Scotland)

References

External links
The Beginnings of the Career of the Sobieski Family at the Wilanów Palace Museum